Seabrook is an unincorporated community and census-designated place (CDP) located in Beaufort County, South Carolina, United States. It was first listed as a CDP in the 2020 census with a population of 1,255.

Situated in northern part of the county along the Whale Branch River, Seabrook was founded in the late 18th century as a collection of plantations became established in the area. In the late 19th century, Seabrook became a stop on the Port Royal and Augusta Railway and featured a small, but bustling downtown area that had a federal Post Office, a general store, a gas station, and a train station. The local economy was driven by the nearby farmland. The village's old economy and markets have since yielded to development in Beaufort, though the Post Office remains to serve the village's remaining inhabitants.  In the past ten years, three new public schools have opened in the Seabrook area to serve area students, including Whale Branch Early College High School.

The McLeod Farmstead was listed on the National Register of Historic Places in 1997.

Demographics

2020 census

Note: the US Census treats Hispanic/Latino as an ethnic category. This table excludes Latinos from the racial categories and assigns them to a separate category. Hispanics/Latinos can be of any race.

References

Sources 
http://www.seabrookpoint.com/
http://www.merchantcircle.com/business/US.Post.Office.843-846-2775
http://www.beaufortsc.org/military/marine-corps-air-station-beaufort.stml
http://beauforttribune.com/archives/56671

Hilton Head Island–Beaufort micropolitan area
Unincorporated communities in Beaufort County, South Carolina
Unincorporated communities in South Carolina
Census-designated places in Beaufort County, South Carolina
Census-designated places in South Carolina